is a railway station located in Tokuda, Nayoro, Hokkaidō. It is operated by the Hokkaido Railway Company.
Station name changed from  Higashi-Fūren on March 12, 2022.

Lines served
Hokkaido Railway Company
Sōya Main Line

Adjacent stations

External links
Ekikara Time Table - JR Higashi-Fūren Station (Japanese)

Railway stations in Hokkaido Prefecture
Railway stations in Japan opened in 1956